Polycera risbeci is a species of sea slug, a nudibranch, a shell-less marine gastropod mollusc in the family Polyceridae.

Distribution 
This species is found in the central Indo-Pacific region.

References

External links
 

Polyceridae
Gastropods described in 1941